Kálnoky is a Hungarian surname meaning "from Kálnok" (now Covasna County). Notable people with the surname include:

 the House of Kálnoky;
 Gustav Kálnoky, Hungarian statesman
 László Kálnoky, a Hungarian poet
 Tomas Kalnoky, Czech-born American musician

See also
List of titled noble families in the Kingdom of Hungary